MTV 80s is the British version of the international music TV channel MTV 80s, which began broadcasting on 31 March 2022, replacing MTV Classic. It was first launched as a temporary reband of MTV Classic from 28 February to 31 March 2020.

Broadcasting

Satellite
Sky UK: Channel 353

Cable
Virgin Media: Channel 316

Notes
 MTV 80s and MTV 90s will launch on 31 March

MTV channels
Music video networks in the United Kingdom
Television channels and stations established in 2022
2022 establishments in the United Kingdom